Agwamin (also Wamin, Ewamin) is an extinct Australian Aboriginal language of North Queensland spoken by the Agwamin people. Agwamin was traditionally spoken in the Etheridge region, in the areas around Einasliegh, Georgetown, and Mount Surprise. There was only one living speaker of the language alive in 1981.

Alternative names and dialects 
Agwamin and Wamin were previously thought to be interchangeable and mutually intelligible. Dixon (2002) counts Wamin as an alternative name for Agwamin. However, the comparison of an Agwamin and a Wamin word list, collected by Sutton, showed that they were separate dialects.

The following is a list of alternative names for Agwamin:

 Wamin
 Ewamin
 Wimanja
 Egwamin
 Gwamin
 Ak Waumin
 Wamin
 Wommin, Waumin, Wawmin
 Walamin
 Wommin
 Walming
 Wailoolo

Vocabulary 
Some words from the Agwamin language, as spelt and written by Agwamin authors include:

 Bungaroo: turtle
 Bunnah: water (fresh)
 Burri: rock
 Gugrah: moon
 Gulberri: boy
 Guyur: fish
 Mulla: hand
 Pumbarra oomba: good day
 Yabu: father

References

External links 
 Bibliography of Agwamin language resources, at the Australian Institute of Aboriginal and Torres Strait Islander Studies

Extinct languages of Queensland
Southern Pama languages